Aquaviva may refer to:

 Claudio Aquaviva, Italian Jesuit priest
 Aquaviva, Pannonia, ancient Roman settlement
 Aquaviva (titular see), medieval Catholic bishopric turned titular see